Abid Mushtaq (born 17 January 1997) is an Indian cricketer. He made his List A debut on 27 September 2019, for Jammu & Kashmir in the 2019–20 Vijay Hazare Trophy. He made his Twenty20 debut on 11 November 2019, for Jammu & Kashmir in the 2019–20 Syed Mushtaq Ali Trophy. He made his first-class debut on 9 December 2019, for Jammu & Kashmir in the 2019–20 Ranji Trophy.

References

External links
 

1997 births
Living people
Indian cricketers
Jammu and Kashmir cricketers
Place of birth missing (living people)